Live Forever or Die Trying is the third full-length album by the punk rock band the Humpers. It is a re-recording of some of their older songs, as their first album on Epitaph records.

Track listing
 "Wake Up & Lose"
 "Soul Surgeon"
 "Sarcasmatron"
 "Fast, Fucked & Furious"
 "Beyond Belief"
 "Migraine Shack"
 "Don't Wanna Be Your Pal"
 "Loser's Club"
 "Space Station Love"
 "World of Hurt"
 "Protex Blue"
 "Drunk Tank"
 "13 Forever"
 "Apocalypse Girl"
 "You Drive Me Bats"
 "Rocket & the Retards"
 "Anarchy Juice"

References 

The Humpers albums
1996 albums